Justin Garces (born August 23, 2000) is an American soccer player who plays for Atlanta United in Major League Soccer.

Career

Youth
Garces played with Atlanta United FC academy whilst also appearing for Atlanta's United Soccer League affiliate Atlanta United 2 during their inaugural season in 2018.

Garces committed to playing college soccer at UCLA from 2018 and beyond.

College
Garces attended UCLA in 2018, going to on to make 57 appearances for the Bruins across four seasons. In his senior year, Garces was named 2021 Pac-12 All-Conference Second Team.

Professional
On January 10, 2022, Garces returned to Atlanta to sign a homegrown player contract with Atlanta United.

Personal life 
Garces has been in a relationship with former elite and UCLA gymnast Norah Flatley since November 2018.

References

External links

2000 births
Living people
American soccer players
Association football goalkeepers
UCLA Bruins men's soccer players
Atlanta United 2 players
Atlanta United FC players
USL Championship players
Soccer players from Florida
Soccer players from Miami
United States men's youth international soccer players
Homegrown Players (MLS)